This is a list of members of the 10th Bundestag – the lower house of parliament of the Federal Republic of Germany, whose members were in office from 1983 until 1987.



Summary 
This summary includes changes in the numbers of the four caucuses (CDU/CSU, SPD, Greens, FDP):

Members

A 

 Manfred Abelein, CDU
 Irmgard Adam-Schwaetzer, FDP
 Karl Ahrens, SPD
 Walter Althammer, CSU (until 14 April 1985)
 Max Amling, SPD
 Robert Antretter, SPD
 Hans Apel, SPD
 Anneliese Augustin, CDU (from 13 January 1984)
 Hendrik Auhagen, Die Grünen (from 17 April 1985)
 Dietrich Austermann, CDU

B 

 Hermann Bachmaier, SPD
 Egon Bahr, SPD
 Georg Bamberg, SPD
 Sabine Bard, Die Grünen (until 31 March 1985)
 Rainer Barzel, CDU
 Gert Bastian, Die Grünen
 Gerhart Baum, FDP
 Richard Bayha, CDU
 Marieluise Beck-Oberdorf, Die Grünen (until 14 April 1985)
 Helmuth Becker, SPD
 Karl Becker, CDU
 Klaus Beckmann, FDP
 Lieselotte Berger, CDU
 Markus Berger, CDU
 Franz-Josef Berners, CDU (from 17 January 1986)
 Hans Gottfried Bernrath, SPD
 Erich Berschkeit, SPD
 Alfred Biehle, CSU
 Rudolf Bindig, SPD
 Joseph-Theodor Blank, CDU
 Heribert Blens, CDU
 Norbert Blüm, CDU
 Lieselott Blunck, SPD
 Friedrich Bohl, CDU
 Wilfried Bohlsen, CDU
 Wilfried Böhm, CDU
 Jochen Borchert, CDU
 Annemarie Borgmann, Die Grünen (from 1 April 1985)
 Peter Boroffka, CDU
 Wolfgang Bötsch, CSU
 Willy Brandt, SPD
 Gerhard Braun, CDU
 Günther Bredehorn, FDP
 Paul Breuer, CDU
 Werner Broll, CDU
 Gerhard Brosi, SPD (until 3 April 1984)
 Alwin Brück, SPD
 Josef Brunner, CSU
 Hans Büchler, SPD
 Peter Büchner, SPD
 Walter Buckpesch, SPD
 Eberhard Bueb, Die Grünen (from 1 April 1985)
 Josef Bugl, CDU
 Klaus Bühler, CDU
 Andreas von Bülow, SPD
 Dieter Burgmann, Die Grünen (until 15 March 1985)
 Helmut Buschbom, CDU
 Hermann Buschfort, SPD

C 

 Manfred Carstens, CDU
 Peter Harry Carstensen, CDU
 Wolf-Michael Catenhusen, SPD
 Joachim Clemens, CDU
 Hugo Collet, SPD
 Franz Josef Conrad, CDU (until 12 September 1985)
 Peter Conradi, SPD
 Peter Corterier, SPD (from 13 June 1984)
 Dieter-Julius Cronenberg, FDP
 Lothar Curdt, SPD
 Herbert Czaja, CDU
 Christa Czempiel, SPD (until 5 July 1984)

D 

 Harm Dallmeyer, CDU (until 11 April 1983)
 Hans Daniels, CDU
 Heidemarie Dann, Die Grünen (from 2 March 1985)
 Klaus Daubertshäuser, SPD
 Herta Däubler-Gmelin, SPD
 Klaus Daweke, CDU
 Karl Delorme, SPD
 Gertrud Dempwolf, CDU (from 22 March 1984)
 Karl Deres, CDU
 Nils Diederich, SPD
 Werner Dolata, CDU
 Werner Dollinger, CSU
 Werner Dörflinger, CDU
 Hansjürgen Doss, CDU
 Dieter Drabiniok, Die Grünen (until 31 March 1985)
 Alfred Dregger, CDU
 Rudolf Dreßler, SPD
 Freimut Duve, SPD

E 

 Jürgen Echternach, CDU
 Jürgen Egert, SPD
 Wolfgang Ehmke, Die Grünen (until 28 March 1985)
 Horst Ehmke, SPD
 Udo Ehrbar, CDU
 Herbert Ehrenberg, SPD
 Karl-Arnold Eickmeyer, SPD (from 23 August 1985)
 Uschi Eid, Die Grünen (from 17 April 1985)
 Karl Eigen, CDU
 Norbert Eimer, FDP
 Alfred Emmerlich, SPD
 Wendelin Enders, SPD
 Hans A. Engelhard, FDP
 Matthias Engelsberger, CSU
 Benno Erhard, CDU
 Josef Ertl, FDP
 Helmut Esters, SPD
 Carl Ewen, SPD
 Horst Eylmann, CDU

F 

 Kurt Faltlhauser, CSU
 Jochen Feilcke, CDU
 Olaf Feldmann, FDP
 Hermann Fellner, CSU
 Udo Fiebig, SPD
 Joschka Fischer, Die Grünen (until 31 March 1985)
 Ulrich Fischer, Die Grünen (from 20 January 1986)
 Dirk Fischer, CDU
 Gernot Fischer, SPD
 Leni Fischer, CDU
 Lothar Fischer, SPD
 Klaus Francke, CDU
 Heinrich Franke, CDU (until 9 April 1984)
 Egon Franke, SPD
 Bernhard Friedmann, CDU
 Horst Fritsch, Die Grünen (from 14 March 1986)
 Anke Fuchs, SPD
 Katrin Fuchs, SPD
 Honor Funk, CDU (from 14 October 1985)

G 

 Georg Gallus, FDP
 Norbert Gansel, SPD
 Johannes Ganz, CDU
 Hans H. Gattermann, FDP
 Michaela Geiger, CSU
 Heiner Geißler, CDU
 Wolfgang von Geldern, CDU
 Hans-Dietrich Genscher, FDP
 Haimo George, CDU (until 5 October 1985)
 Paul Gerlach, CSU
 Ludwig Gerstein, CDU
 Johannes Gerster, CDU
 Friedrich Gerstl, SPD
 Konrad Gilges, SPD
 Eugen Glombig, SPD
 Michael Glos, CSU
 Peter Glotz, SPD
 Horst Gobrecht, SPD (until 29 June 1984)
 Reinhard Göhner, CDU
 Gabriele Gottwald, Die Grünen (until 31 March 1985)
 Eike Götz, CSU
 Wolfgang Götzer, CSU (from 4 June 1984)
 Claus Grobecker, SPD (until 14 November 1983)
 Josef Grünbeck, FDP
 Horst Grunenberg, SPD
 Martin Grüner, FDP
 Horst Günther, CDU

H 

 Dieter Haack, SPD
 Ernst Haar, SPD
 Lothar Haase, CDU (until 5 December 1983)
 Horst Haase, SPD
 Wolfgang Hackel, CDU (until 1 December 1985)
 Karl Haehser, SPD
 Hansjörg Häfele, CDU
 Hildegard Hamm-Brücher, FDP
 Carl-Detlev Freiherr von Hammerstein, CDU (from 9 April 1984)
 Franz Handlos, CSU
 Uwe Hansen, SPD (from 29 June 1984)
 August Hanz, CDU
 Liesel Hartenstein, SPD
 Klaus Hartmann, CSU (until 4 June 1984)
 Ingomar Hauchler, SPD
 Rudolf Hauck, SPD
 Volker Hauff, SPD
 Rainer Haungs, CDU
 Hansheinz Hauser, CDU
 Otto Hauser, CDU
 Helmut Haussmann, FDP
 Klaus Hecker, Die Grünen (until 31 August 1983)
 Klaus-Jürgen Hedrich, CDU
 Constantin Heereman von Zuydtwyck, CDU
 Gerhard Heimann, SPD
 Dieter Heistermann, SPD
 Renate Hellwig, CDU
 Herbert Helmrich, CDU
 Ottfried Hennig, CDU
 Adolf Herkenrath, CDU
 Günter Herterich, SPD
 Ludwig Hettling, SPD (from 15 November 1983)
 Günther Heyenn, SPD
 Erika Hickel, Die Grünen (until 9 March 1985)
 Reinhold Hiller, SPD
 Wolfgang Hinrichs, CDU
 Ernst Hinsken, CSU
 Burkhard Hirsch, FDP
 Paul Hoffacker, CDU
 Klaus-Jürgen Hoffie, FDP
 Peter Wilhelm Höffkes, CSU
 Hajo Hoffmann, SPD (until 11 April 1985)
 Ingeborg Hoffmann, CDU
 Uwe Holtz, SPD
 Hannegret Hönes, Die Grünen (from 13 April 1985)
 Stefan Höpfinger, CSU
 Hans-Günter Hoppe, FDP
 Milan Horácek, Die Grünen (from 2 September 1983 until 3 October 1985)
 Erwin Horn, SPD
 Karl-Heinz Hornhues, CDU
 Siegfried Hornung, CDU
 Martin Horstmeier, CDU (from 3 December 1986)
 Willi Hoss, Die Grünen (until 12 April 1985)
 Antje Huber, SPD
 Gunter Huonker, SPD
 Herbert Hupka, CDU
 Agnes Hürland-Büning, CDU
 Heinz Günther Hüsch, CDU
 Hans Graf Huyn, CSU

I 

 Lothar Ibrügger, SPD
 Klaus Immer, SPD

J 

 Claus Jäger, CDU
 Bernhard Jagoda, CDU
 Friedrich-Adolf Jahn, CDU
 Gerhard Jahn, SPD
 Gert Jannsen, Die Grünen (until 1 March 1985)
 Günther Jansen, SPD
 Horst Jaunich, SPD
 Philipp Jenninger, CDU
 Uwe Jens, SPD
 Dionys Jobst, CSU
 Volker Jung, SPD
 Wilhelm Jung, CDU
 Hans-Jürgen Junghans, SPD
 Horst Jungmann, SPD

K 

 Joachim Kalisch, CDU
 Dietmar Kansy, CDU
 Irmgard Karwatzki, CDU
 Ernst Kastning, SPD
 Peter Keller, CSU
 Petra Kelly, Die Grünen
 Ignaz Kiechle, CSU
 Günter Kiehm, SPD
 Klaus Kirschner, SPD
 Karl Kisslinger, SPD
 Peter Kittelmann, CDU
 Hans Hugo Klein, CDU (until 20 December 1983)
 Hans Klein, CSU
 Heinrich Klein, SPD
 Hubert Kleinert, Die Grünen (until 19 January 1986)
 Detlef Kleinert, FDP
 Karl-Heinz Klejdzinski, SPD
 Hans-Ulrich Klose, SPD
 Helmut Kohl, CDU
 Herbert W Köhler, CDU
 Volkmar Köhler, CDU
 Roland Kohn, FDP
 Elmar Kolb, CDU
 Walter Kolbow, SPD
 Rudolf Kraus, CSU
 Reinhold Kreile, CSU
 Volkmar Kretkowski, SPD
 Franz Heinrich Krey, CDU
 Julyus H Krizsan, Die Grünen (until 13 March 1985)
 Hermann Kroll-Schlüter, CDU
 Ursula Krone-Appuhn, CSU
 Friedrich Kronenberg, CDU
 Klaus Kübler, SPD
 Klaus-Dieter Kühbacher, SPD
 Eckart Kuhlwein, SPD
 Max Kunz, CSU

L 

 Karl-Hans Laermann, FDP
 Manfred Lahnstein, SPD (until 31 August 1983)
 Uwe Lambinus, SPD
 Otto Graf Lambsdorff, FDP
 Karl Lamers, CDU
 Norbert Lammert, CDU
 Heinz Landré, CDU
 Torsten Lange, Die Grünen (from 17 April 1985)
 Manfred Langner, CDU
 Herbert Lattmann, CDU
 Paul Laufs, CDU
 Karl Heinz Lemmrich, CSU
 Klaus Lennartz, SPD
 Carl Otto Lenz, CDU (until 13 January 1984)
 Christian Lenzer, CDU
 Günther Leonhart, SPD
 Renate Lepsius, SPD (from 12 April 1984)
 Karl Liedtke, SPD
 Jürgen Linde, SPD (until 10 November 1983)
 Helmut Link, CDU
 Walter Link, CDU
 Josef Linsmeier, CSU
 Eduard Lintner, CSU
 Klaus Lippold, CDU
 Lothar Löffler, SPD
 Paul Löher, CDU
 Klaus Lohmann, SPD
 Wolfgang Lohmann, CDU
 Peter Lorenz, CDU
 Julyus Louven, CDU
 Ortwin Lowack, CSU
 Egon Lutz, SPD
 Dagmar Luuk, SPD

M 

 Erich Maaß, CDU
 Theo Magin, CDU
 Norbert Mann, Die Grünen (from 1 April 1985)
 Ursula Männle, CSU
 Erwin Marschewski, CDU
 Anke Martiny-Glotz, SPD
 Werner Marx, CDU (until 12 July 1985)
 Ingrid Matthäus-Maier, SPD
 Hans Matthöfer, SPD
 Alfred Meininghaus, SPD
 Heinz Menzel, SPD
 Franz-Josef Mertens, SPD
 Alois Mertes, CDU (until 16 June 1985)
 Reinhard Metz, CDU
 Reinhard Meyer zu Bentrup, CDU
 Meinolf Michels, CDU
 Paul Mikat, CDU
 Karl Miltner, CDU
 Peter Milz, CDU (until 26 November 1986)
 Wolfgang Mischnick, FDP
 Peter Mitzscherling, SPD
 Helmuth Möhring, SPD (from 8 July 1986)
 Jürgen Möllemann, FDP
 Franz Möller, CDU
 Joachim Müller, Die Grünen (from 13 March 1985)
 Adolf Müller, CDU
 Alfons Müller, CDU
 Günther Müller, CSU
 Hans-Werner Müller, CDU
 Michael Müller, SPD
 Rudolf Müller, SPD
 Adolf Müller-Emmert, SPD
 Franz Müntefering, SPD

N 

 Werner Nagel, SPD
 Albert Nehm, SPD
 Engelbert Nelle, CDU
 Friedrich Neuhausen, FDP
 Volker Neumann, SPD (from 11 November 1983)
 Hanna Neumeister, CDU
 Christa Nickels, Die Grünen (until 30 March 1985)
 Lorenz Niegel, CSU
 Wilhelm Nöbel, SPD

O 

 Doris Odendahl, SPD
 Rainer Offergeld, SPD (until 1 June 1984)
 Martin Oldenstädt, CDU
 Rolf Olderog, CDU
 Jan Oostergetelo, SPD

P 

 Doris Pack, CDU (from 1 October 1985)
 Johann Paintner, FDP
 Peter Paterna, SPD
 Günter Pauli, SPD
 Willfried Penner, SPD
 Hans-Wilhelm Pesch, CDU
 Horst Peter, SPD
 Peter Petersen, CDU
 Gerhard O Pfeffermann, CDU
 Anton Pfeifer, CDU
 Gero Pfennig, CDU (from 2 December 1985)
 Albert Pfuhl, SPD
 Winfried Pinger, CDU
 Eberhard Pohlmann, CDU
 Heinrich Pohlmeier, CDU
 Walter Polkehn, SPD (until 16 August 1985)
 Ernst Josef Pöppl, CSU (from 15 April 1985)
 Konrad Porzner, SPD
 Joachim Poß, SPD
 Gabriele Potthast, Die Grünen (until 3 April 1985)
 Albert Probst, CSU
 Rudolf Purps, SPD

R 

 Fred Ranker, SPD (from 11 April 1985)
 Heinz Rapp, SPD
 Hermann Rappe, SPD
 Wilhelm Rawe, CDU
 Gerhard Reddemann, CDU
 Jürgen Reents, Die Grünen (until 19 March 1985)
 Christa Reetz, Die Grünen (until 16 April 1985)
 Otto Regenspurger, CSU
 Manfred Reimann, SPD
 Annemarie Renger, SPD
 Hans-Peter Repnik, CDU
 Otto Reschke, SPD
 Peter Reuschenbach, SPD
 Bernd Reuter, SPD
 Erich Riedl, CSU
 Heinz Riesenhuber, CDU
 Helmut Rode, CDU
 Helmut Rohde, SPD
 Ingrid Roitzsch, CDU
 Uwe Ronneburger, FDP
 Hannelore Rönsch, CDU
 Klaus Rose, CSU
 Kurt Rossmanith, CSU
 Adolf Roth, CDU
 Wolfgang Roth, SPD
 Rudolf Ruf, CDU
 Volker Rühe, CDU
 Wolfgang Rumpf, FDP
 Herbert Rusche, Die Grünen (from 4 October 1985)

S 

 Engelbert Sander, SPD
 Helmut Sauer, CDU
 Roland Sauer, CDU
 Walter Sauermilch, Die Grünen (until 16 April 1985)
 Wolfgang Saurin, CDU (from 19 April 1983)
 Alfred Sauter, CSU
 Franz Sauter, CDU
 Harald B Schäfer, SPD
 Helmut Schäfer, FDP
 Dieter Schanz, SPD
 Heribert Scharrenbroich, CDU (from 19 June 1985)
 Günther Schartz, CDU
 Wolfgang Schäuble, CDU
 Hermann Scheer, SPD
 Heinz Schemken, CDU
 Franz Ludwig Schenk Graf von Stauffenberg, CSU (until 20 November 1984)
 Gerhard Scheu, CSU
 Henning Schierholz, Die Grünen (from 14 March 1985)
 Otto Schily, Die Grünen (until 13 March 1986)
 Georg Schlaga, SPD
 Günter Schlatter, SPD
 Norbert Schlottmann, CDU
 Günter Schluckebier, SPD
 Helga Schmedt, SPD (from 1 September 1983)
 Bernd Schmidbauer, CDU
 Christian Schmidt, Die Grünen (from 22 March 1985)
 Adolf Schmidt, SPD
 Helmut Schmidt, SPD
 Manfred Schmidt, SPD
 Martin Schmidt, SPD
 Renate Schmidt, SPD
 Rudi Schmitt, SPD
 Hans Peter Schmitz, CDU
 Jürgen Schmude, SPD
 Michael von Schmude, CDU
 Dirk Schneider, Die Grünen (until 30 March 1985)
 Manfred Schneider, CDU
 Oscar Schneider, CSU
 Rudolf Schöfberger, SPD
 Waltraud Schoppe, Die Grünen (until 31 March 1985)
 Reinhard von Schorlemer, CDU
 Werner Schreiber, CDU
 Ottmar Schreiner, SPD
 Horst Schröder, CDU (until 22 March 1984)
 Gerhard Schröder, SPD (until 1 July 1986)
 Conrad Schroeder, CDU
 Thomas Schröer, SPD
 Wolfgang Schulhoff, CDU
 Stefan Schulte, Die Grünen (from 13 April 1985)
 Dieter Schulte, CDU
 Manfred Schulte, SPD
 Helmut Schultz, CDU (from 22 July 1985)
 Gerhard Schulze, CDU
 Heinz Schwarz, CDU
 Christian Schwarz-Schilling, CDU
 Wolfgang Schwenk, SPD
 Walter Schwenninger, Die Grünen (until 16 April 1985)
 Hermann Schwörer, CDU
 Horst Seehofer, CSU
 Heinrich Seesing, CDU
 Inge Segall, FDP (from 13 December 1984)
 Ursula Seiler-Albring, FDP
 Rudolf Seiters, CDU
 Hans-Werner Senfft, Die Grünen (from 3 April 1985)
 Horst Sielaff, SPD
 Wolfgang Sieler, SPD
 Heide Simonis, SPD
 Sigrid Skarpelis-Sperk, SPD
 Hartmut Soell, SPD
 Hermann Otto Solms, FDP
 Dietrich Sperling, SPD
 Adolf Freiherr Spies von Büllesheim, CDU
 Karl-Heinz Spilker, CSU
 Dieter Spöri, SPD
 Carl-Dieter Spranger, CSU
 Rudolf Sprung, CDU
 Erwin Stahl, SPD
 Anton Stark, CDU
 Lutz Stavenhagen, CDU
 Ulrich Steger, SPD (until 9 July 1984)
 Heinz-Alfred Steiner, SPD
 Waltraud Steinhauer, SPD
 Hans Stercken, CDU
 Ludwig Stiegler, SPD
 Dietrich Stobbe, SPD
 Karl Stockhausen, CDU (from 6 December 1983)
 Adolf Stockleben, SPD
 Gerhard Stoltenberg, CDU
 Wilhelm Peter Stommel, CDU (from 21 March 1985)
 Günter Straßmeir, CDU
 Eckhard Stratmann, Die Grünen (until 31 March 1985)
 Hans-Christian Ströbele, Die Grünen (from 31 March 1985)
 Hans-Gerd Strube, CDU
 Peter Struck, SPD
 Richard Stücklen, CSU
 Hans-Jürgen Stutzer, CDU
 Heinz Suhr, Die Grünen (from 1 April 1985)
 Egon Susset, CDU

T 

 Willi Tatge, Die Grünen (from 18 June 1985)
 Margitta Terborg, SPD
 Günther Tietjen, SPD
 Ferdinand Tillmann, CDU
 Helga Timm, SPD
 Udo Tischer, Die Grünen (from 3 April 1985)
 Jürgen Todenhöfer, CDU
 Hans-Günther Toetemeyer, SPD
 Brigitte Traupe, SPD

U 

 Gunnar Uldall, CDU
 Hermann Josef Unland, CDU
 Hans-Eberhard Urbaniak, SPD

V 

 Jürgen Vahlberg, SPD
 Günter Verheugen, SPD
 Hans Verheyen, Die Grünen (until 30 March 1985)
 Roswitha Verhülsdonk, CDU
 Axel Vogel, Die Grünen (from 16 March 1985)
 Friedrich Vogel, CDU
 Hans-Jochen Vogel, SPD
 Kurt Vogelsang, SPD
 Roland Vogt, Die Grünen (until 18 June 1985)
 Wolfgang Vogt, CDU
 Hans-Peter Voigt, CDU (from 21 December 1983)
 Ekkehard Voigt, CSU
 Karsten Voigt, SPD
 Antje Vollmer, Die Grünen (until 2 April 1985)
 Ludger Volmer, Die Grünen (from 10 April 1985)
 Josef Vosen, SPD
 Friedrich Voss, CSU

W 

 Horst Waffenschmidt, CDU
 Marita Wagner, Die Grünen (from 3 April 1985)
 Theodor Waigel, CSU
 Alois Graf von Waldburg-Zeil, CDU
 Ernst Waltemathe, SPD
 Rudi Walther, SPD
 Jürgen Warnke, CSU
 Alexander Warrikoff, CDU
 Gerd Wartenberg, SPD
 Ludolf von Wartenberg, CDU
 Karl Weinhofer, SPD
 Dieter Weirich, CDU
 Willi Weiskirch, CDU (until 20 March 1985)
 Werner Weiß, CDU
 Gert Weisskirchen, SPD
 Wolfgang Weng, FDP
 Helmut Werner, Die Grünen (from 2 April 1985)
 Gerd Peter Werner, Die Grünen (from 16 April 1985)
 Herbert Werner, CDU
 Axel Wernitz, SPD
 Heinz Westphal, SPD
 Helga Wex, CDU (until 9 January 1986)
 Gudrun Weyel, SPD
 Norbert Wieczorek, SPD (from 11 July 1984)
 Helmut Wieczorek, SPD
 Bruno Wiefel, SPD
 Eugen von der Wiesche, SPD
 Waltrud Will-Feld, CDU
 Dorothee Wilms, CDU
 Bernd Wilz, CDU
 Hermann Wimmer, SPD
 Willy Wimmer, CDU
 Heinrich Windelen, CDU
 Hans-Jürgen Wischnewski, SPD
 Roswitha Wisniewski, CDU
 Matthias Wissmann, CDU
 Lothar Witek, SPD (from 16 July 1984)
 Hans de With, SPD
 Simon Wittmann, CSU (from 20 November 1984)
 Fritz Wittmann, CSU
 Torsten Wolfgramm, FDP
 Erich Wolfram, SPD
 Manfred Wörner, CDU
 Otto Wulff, CDU
 Richard Wurbs, FDP (until 13 December 1984)
 Peter Würtz, SPD
 Peter Kurt Würzbach, CDU

Z 

 Fred Zander, SPD
 Karin Zeitler, Die Grünen (from 3 April 1985)
 Werner Zeitler, SPD
 Benno Zierer, CSU
 Friedrich Zimmermann, CSU
 Otto Zink, CDU
 Ruth Zutt, SPD

See also 

 Politics of Germany
 List of Bundestag Members

11